Fisterra is a municipality in the province of A Coruña, in the autonomous community of Galicia, Spain. It belongs to the comarca of Fisterra. Fisterra is on Cape Finisterre, the final destination for many pilgrims on the Way of St. James.

Fisterra is on the rocky Costa da Morte (Galician: "Coast of Death"), named because of the large number of shipwrecks along these shores. The name Fisterra comes from Latin FINIS TERRAE, meaning "Land's End". This name stems from the fact that this area is on a remote peninsula that is one of the westernmost points of land in Galicia, and hence in Spain.

Fisterra is an ancient port and fishing village, formed by narrow streets leading to the Plaza de Ara Solis. The chapel of Nosa Señora do Bon Suceso, dating from the 18th century, is on the plaza. There is a lighthouse on a 600-metre promontory called "Monte Facho" at the tip of Cape Finisterre overlooking the Atlantic Ocean. On the road up to the lighthouse is the parish church of Santa María de Fisterra which contains the Chapel of Santo Cristo.

Fisterra is 108 km from A Coruña, and 98 km from Santiago de Compostela.

Geography

Fisterra has several beaches like O Rostro, Arnela, Mar de Fóra, Langosteira, Ribeira, and Corveiro.  Many of the beaches are framed by steep cliffs leading down to the "Mare Tenebrosum" (or dark sea, the name of the Atlantic in the Middle Ages).

There are several rocks in this area associated with religious legends, such as the "holy stones", the "stained wine stones", the "stone chair", and the tomb of Orcabella.

History
After the discovery of the remains of St. James, pilgrims on the Way of St. James started to arrive from Santiago to Fisterra to worship in front of an image of Sacred Christ, view the relics of San Guillerme, and see the "End of the Earth".

In 1479, a hospital to accommodate the arriving pilgrims was built. Many of the pilgrims were noblemen or otherwise famous.

Thousands of visitors continue to arrive in Fisterra every day.

Pre-Christian beliefs

In the area there are many remnants of pre-Christian beliefs and sacred locations. On Cape Finisterre, some claim that there is the "Altar Soli", where the Celts engaged in sun worship and assorted rituals.

The Monte Facho, on Cape Finisterre, was the place where the Celtic Nerios from Duio carried out their offerings and rites in honour of the sun. St. William of Gellone also lived in a house located there. Near St. William's house, sterile couples would have sexual intercourse on one specific stone to try to conceive, following a Celtic rite of fertility.

Main sights
Castle of San Carlos, built during the reign of Charles III of Spain.
Church of Nosa Señora das Areas (late 12th century, modified later). It houses the image of the Holy Christ of Fisterra.
Bon Suceso Chapel (18th century)
Fisterra Lighthouse, the main on the Costa da Morte.

Culture

Every Easter there is a local festival featuring the Christ of the Golden Beard.

Civil parishes
 Duio (San Vicenzo)
 Fisterra (Santa María)
 San Martiño de Duio (San Martiño) 
 Sardiñeiro (San Xoán)

Demography 
From:INE Archiv

References

External links

Official website
Cape Finisterre and the Camino de Santiago - Secret World

Municipalities in the Province of A Coruña